Saint-Maclou is a commune in the Eure department in Normandy in northern France.

It has two chateaux within its boundaries: the chateau de St Maclou-la-Campagne just outside the village, and the Chateau du Mont. The name comes from Maclovius, the Latin name for a monk of Welsh origin who also gave his name to Saint-Malo, a much larger city in Brittany.

Population

See also
Communes of the Eure department

References

Communes of Eure